Typhoon and Other Stories is a collection of short fiction by Joseph Conrad published in 1903 by William Heinemann and Company.

Stories

Three of the four works from the collection first appeared in literary journals. The magazine and date are listed below.
“TYphoon” (The Pall Mall Magazine, January–March 1902)
“Falk” (Never serialized)
“Amy Foster” (The Illustrated London News, December 1901)
“Tomorrow” (Pall Mall Magazine, August 1902)

Background

Conrad began writing the four short stories that would comprise Typhoon and Other Stories while he was attempting to complete the third and final story for the proposed collection Youth, A Narrative; and Two Other Stories (1902) for William Blackwood and Sons. Setting aside “The End of the Tether”- and after finishing his novel Lord Jim (1900) - Conrad penned in quick succession “Typhoon”, “Falk”, “Amy Foster” and “Tomorrow.”

Written at the personal request of publisher William Heinemann, Conrad was nominally subject to an arrangement permitting Blackwood publishing in Maga a “first refusal” for all his new stories. This awkward situation induced Conrad to enlist the services of a literary agent, J. B. Pinker. Pinker procured a substantially higher fee for the serialization of “Typhoon” and “Amy Foster'' from other journals than offered by Blackwood.

Literary critic Laurence Graver notes the impact of Conrad’s disengagement from Blackwood and his reliance on Pinker:

Footnotes

Sources 
Baines, Jocelyn. 1960. Joseph Conrad: A Critical Biography, McGraw-Hill Book Company, New York. 
Graver, Laurence. 1969. Conrad’s Short Fiction. University of California Press, Berkeley, California. 

Short story collections by Joseph Conrad
1903 short story collections